Attenborosaurus is an extinct genus of pliosaurid from the Early Jurassic of Dorset, England. The type species is A. conybeari. The genus is named after David Attenborough, the species after William Conybeare.

History

The original remains of the holotype, specimen PV OR 38525, were discovered in Charmouth, Dorset, England in 1880 and was described in 1881 before being housed at the Bristol City Museum and Art Gallery, where a cast was taken of NHMUK R1339 and sent to the Natural History Museum in London by William Johnson Sollas, where it stayed until the holotype was destroyed in November 1940, during World War II, leaving only plaster casts of the remains to be studied; the type cast (specimen NHMUK R1339) is now housed at the Natural History Museum, London along with a referred specimen (specimen NHMUK OR40140/R1360; includes no head, neck or tail, most of the body, ribs and all flippers except for the front right) and another partial specimen, including a skull and postcrania purchased by E.C. Day in 1866 (specimen NHMUK OR40140), also from Dorset. At first the animal was thought to be another Plesiosaurus species by William Johnson Sollas in 1881, but after studies on the plaster casts made after the remains, Plesiosaurus conybeari was assigned to a new genus (Attenborosaurus) by Robert T. Bakker in 1993.

Description

Much like its plesiosaur cousins, it was piscivorous. From the skin impression found with the bones, which was later destroyed, it is presumed that the creature had membranous skin, devoid of any significantly large scales, probably for decreasing water resistances.

Classification
The following cladogram follows an analysis by Benson & Druckenmiller (2014).
<div class="noprint">

See also
 List of things named after David Attenborough and his works
 Timeline of plesiosaur research
 List of plesiosaur genera

References

External links
 David Attenborough and his 'Attenborosaurus' on YouTube
 Attenborosaurus on The Plesiosaur Directory

Early Jurassic plesiosaurs of Europe
Fossil taxa described in 1993
Pliosaurids
Taxa named by Robert T. Bakker
David Attenborough
Sauropterygian genera